Panjab University (PU) is an Indian collegiate public state university located in Chandigarh. Funded through both State and Union governments, it is considered a state university. It traces its origins to the University of the Punjab in Lahore, which was founded in 1882. After the partition of India, the university was established on October 1, 1947, and called East Punjab University. Initially housed primarily at a cantonment in Solan, it later relocated to a newly built campus in Chandigarh, and was renamed Panjab University.

The university has 78 teaching and research departments and 10 centres/chairs for teaching and research at the main campus located at Chandigarh. It has 188 affiliated colleges spread over the eight districts of Punjab state and union-territory of Chandigarh, with Regional Centres at Muktsar, Ludhiana and Hoshiarpur . It is one of the well-ranked universities in India.

The main administrative and academic buildings are located in sector 14, beside a health centre, a sports complex, hostels and residential housing.

History
The University of the Punjab was established on 14 October 1882 at Lahore (now in Punjab, Pakistan). The fate of the university after the partition of India in 1947, was deliberated at the Punjab Partition Committee, with representatives from East Punjab advocating for a division of the university. The senate of the university voted to split the university, and the matter reached the Partition Council at the centre, but a decision could not be made. With no university for the colleges in its territory, the government in East Punjab was compelled to bring an ordinance to set up a new university on September 27, 1947. The new university was then established in Solan (Shimla) of the Indian Punjab as the "East Punjab University" on October 1, 1947. After 1947, the university had no campus of its own for nearly a decade. The administrative office was in Solan and the teaching departments functioned from Hoshiarpur, Jalandhar, Delhi, and Amritsar. The name was later shortened to Panjab University in 1950.

In 1956 the university was relocated to Chandigarh, on a red sandstone campus designed by Pierre Jeanneret under the guidance of Le Corbusier. Until the re-organisation of Punjab in 1966, the university had its regional centres at Rohtak, Shimla, Jalandhar and its affiliated colleges were in the present-day states of Punjab, Haryana and Himachal Pradesh. With the re-organisation of Punjab, the university became an Inter-State Body Corporate catering to the newly organised state of Punjab and the union-territory of Chandigarh.

Campus

The university's chequerboard layout was devised by Swiss-French Architect Pierre Jeanneret. The main campus at Chandigarh is spread over 550 acres in Sectors 14 and 25, the teaching area is in the north-east, with the Central Library, Fine Arts Museum, and three-winged structure of the Gandhi Bhawan forming its core; the sports complex, the health centre, the dolphinarium, student centre and the shopping centre in the middle; 16 university hostels and residential area in the south-east, stretching into the adjacent Sector 25 which also houses the University Institute of Engineering and Technology, Dr. Harvansh Singh Judge Institute of Dental Sciences and Hospital, UIAMS, and Institute of Biological Sciences. The campus in Sector 25 is also known as the south campus.

Halls of residence

There are eighteen hostels on the campus including eight hostels for men and eleven women hostels including a Working Women Hostel. A Sports Hostel has been built for visiting sports teams. Two more hostels are under construction, one each for boys and girls. There is one International hostel also. All the NRI/Foreign national girls students are accommodated there.

Sports

The university has playgrounds, a gymnasium and a swimming pool for its sports activities. The Directorate of Sports organises about 70 Inter-College and four to five Inter-University Competitions every year. The Directorate of Sports participates in 62 games both for men and women in the Inter-University Competitions and arranges training camps in these games under the supervision of expert coaches. The university has been awarded Maulana Abul Kalam Azad (MAKA) Trophy fifteen times, the latest being in the year 2020. MAKA Trophy represents the highest award given for inter-university sports and university sportsperson performance in the international and national arena by the Government of India.

Gandhi Bhawan

The Gandhi Bhawan is a major landmark of the city of Chandigarh. Designed by the architect Pierre Jeanneret, a cousin of Le Corbusier, it is an auditorium hall that sits in the middle of a pond of water. It also houses a collection of books on Gandhi.

The Student Centre

The Student Centre, popularly known as StuC, is a major landmark of the city of Chandigarh and a hub for student activities. It was inaugurated in 1975. It houses the office of the university students' council. There used to be a cafeteria called Indian Coffee House with a panoramic view on the top floor of the centre but now it has shut down its operations. Various events and plays are performed in the Student Centre.

Library

The Central Library is named after its late Vice-Chancellor of the university, Prof. A C Joshi. It is located near the student centre. It was designed by Swiss architect Pierre Jeanneret. The foundation stone of the Library was laid in 1958 by  Dr Sarvepalli Radhakrishnan, the then vice-president of India, and it was formally inaugurated in 1963 by the then Prime Minister of India Jawaharlal Nehru. With a collection of 6,70,000 titles, it is one of the largest libraries in North India.

Museum of Fine Arts

Museum of Fine Arts is a part of the Department of Art History and Visual Arts, inaugurated in 1968. The Museum building, made in red sandstone, is one of the most iconic landmarks in the university campus and has been earmarked as a heritage building. It has a large collection of works of contemporary Indian art, including paintings, sculptures, graphics and drawings by artists such as Jamini Roy, M.F. Husain, Satish Gujral, J. Swaminathan, Ram Kumar, A. Ramachandran, K.G. Subramanyan, Vivan Sundaram, Bhupen Khakhar, Dhanraj Bhagat, Arpana Caur, Shiv Singh etc.

Organization and administration

Governance
The day-to-day functioning of the university is headed by Vice Chancellor. The office of the Dean of University Instruction (DUI) is the academic head of Panjab University and its Regional Centres.

Faculties

Faculty of Engineering and Technology

 University Institute of Engineering and Technology (UIET) is an on campus engineering institute. UIET is in the southern campus of Panjab University, Sector 25, Chandigarh. It has two academic blocks which include labs, offices, library, and lecture halls. There are blocks for mechanical labs and workshops. There is an ATM. Wi-Fi and Internet access is provided in some parts of the campus. Students are from all over the nation: few are day scholars and many live in hostels which provide accommodation, food, washrooms, and sporting facilities.
 University Institute for Chemical Engineering and Technology (UICET), originally called the Department of Chemical Engineering and Technology, UICET came out of a demand to make the sciences of direct use to society. The department was disrupted during the partition of India when most of the faculty and students chose to come to India. For a few years, it was housed in Delhi. Then in 1958, it shifted to its present premises in Chandigarh. In collaboration with the Illinois Institute of Technology, Chicago. Professor R. E. Peck from IIT Chicago joined as the first Head. Over the years the department evolved into the University Institute for Chemical Engineering and Technology. In 1983, an Energy Research Institute was added within the UICET building to promote R&D in the field of renewable energy.

UICET is one of the regional centres of the Indian Institute of Chemical Engineers. 2008 was the Golden Jubilee year of the institute. As part of the celebrations, the institute hosted CHEMCON-2008, the 61st annual session of the Indian Institute of Chemical Engineers, which also included a joint US-India Conference on Energy.

Faculty of Law
The university has two departments for teaching law. The National Institutional Ranking Framework (NIRF) has ranked Faculty of Law, Panjab University 15 in the National Law Rankings 2020.

 Department of Law offers two courses:
 Degree of LL.B, a three-year course, the eligibility for admission is graduation degree in any stream, with a minimum 45% marks.
 Degree in LL.M, a one-year course, which is offered after completion of LL.B.

The department conducts a separate admission test, for both courses, on the pattern of the Union Public Service Commission.

 University Institute of Legal Studies was established as a separate department in 2004. The institute offers B.A/LL.B(Hons.) and B.Com./LL.B (Hons.) five-years integrated courses and has three hundred and sixty seats. This institute has been a partner institute for Surana & Surana National Trial Advocacy Moot Court Competition.

Faculty of Business Management and Commerce

 University Business School (UBS) imparts commerce and business management education. The Department of Commerce and Business Management was rechristened into University Business School in 1995. The department  offers various courses such as M.Com (Honours), Ph.D (Commerce and Business Management), M.B.A (General), M.B.A (Entrepreneurship), M.B.A (Human Resource Management), M.B.A (International Business) and  Executive M.B.A.
 University Institute of Applied Management Sciences was started in 2008 by the Faculty of Business Management & Commerce, PU, Chandigarh. It is housed in the south campus, Sector 25. UIAMS offers M.B.A course in industry ready sectoral areas and streams with specialization in functional areas like Marketing, Finance, Human Resources and Operations. M.B.A at UIAMS Chandigarh is a two-year course. Students are given training offers with stipend by various leading companies during the course. UIAMS graduates tend to benefit from good job placements in major companies.
 University Institute of Hotel and Tourism Management (UIHTM)  offers education, training, research and consultancy in the field of hospitality, tourism, travel and allied sectors. This institute was established in the year 2009 under the faculty of Business Management and Commerce.

Constituent Colleges
 Baba Balraj Panjab University Constituent College, Balachaur (SBS Nagar)
 Panjab University Constituent College, Mokham Khan Wala (Ferozepur)
 Panjab University Constituent College, Nihalsingh Wala (Moga)
 Panjab University Constituent College, Dharamkot (Moga)
 Panjab University Constituent College, Sikhwala (Sri Muktsar Sahib)
 Saheed Udham Singh Panjab University Constituent College, Guru Har Sahai (Ferozpur)

Regional Centres
Originally, the university had three regional centres, one each in Ludhiana, Rohtak and Shimla. Currently, the university has following regional centres in the state of Punjab:
 Panjab University Regional Centre, Ludhiana
 Panjab University Regional Centre, Muktsar
 Panjab University Swami Sarvanand Giri Regional Centre, Hoshiarpur
 Panjab University Rural Centre, Kauni

Academics

Departments and courses
The university comprises 78 departments, 15 centres/chairs on the campus and six Constituent Colleges located at Sikhwala (Sri Muktsar Sahib),  Balachaur (SBS Nagar),  Nihalsingh Wala (Moga),  Dharamkot (Moga),  Mokham Khan Wala (Ferozepur) and  Guru Harsahai (Ferozepur) and one rural regional centre. Three regional centres are grouped under the faculties of Arts, Science, Languages, Law, Education, Design and Fine Arts, Business Management and Commerce, Engineering and Technology, Hotel Management and Tourism, Medical Sciences, and Pharmaceutical Sciences. There are also departments of Evening Studies and Distance Learning. Most departments have their own libraries. The Faculty of Languages also has courses in foreign languages. The Department of Chinese and Tibetan languages runs 7 courses. One in Buddhist Studies and three each in Tibetan and Chin. besides providing research guidance in Buddhist Studies.

Rankings

Internationally, Panjab University was ranked 1201–1400 in the QS World University Rankings of 2023 and 301–350 in Asia. It was ranked 801–1000 in the world by the Times Higher Education World University Rankings of 2023, 197 in Asia in 2022 and 201–250 among emerging economies.

In India, the National Institutional Ranking Framework (NIRF) has ranked Panjab University 38th overall in 2021, 23rd among universities, 89th in the engineering ranking, and second in India in the pharmacy ranking.

Research

ICSSR
The Indian Council of Social Science Research has set up its North-Western Regional Centre on the campus. The centre runs a library, a seminar complex and a guest house for visiting scholars under its study-grants programme.

Institute of Social Science Education and Research 
Institute of Social Science Education and Research (commonly known as ISSER or PU-ISSER) is a liberal arts institution and a constituent department of the Panjab University. The institute offers a five-year integrated, honour-school Masters of Arts degree in the Social Sciences.

Research facilities
The university has been recognised by the UGC as the "University with Potential for Excellence in Bio-Medical Sciences" with facilities for Stem Cell Research and Drug Development.

The university is one of six centres in the country for super-computing facilities to serve the north-western region in the Technology Information Forecasting and Assessment Council (TIFAC), DST. The government of India has identified the university as a Special Centre. The university provides internet connections for more than 1800 terminals for the use of faculty members and students. All the buildings of the university including hostels are connected through ATM and Gigabit technology.

The university has a DST supported Regional Sophisticated Instrumentation Centre along with a Central Instrumentation Laboratory (CIL) and a University Science Instrumentation Centre (USIC) to serve the scientific community on the campus and in the region. The Centre for Industry Institute Partnership Programme (CIIPP) promotes the academic-industry interface.

Energy Research Centre
The Energy Research Centre was established in 1983 at Panjab University to promote R&D and Extension activities in Renewable Energy. The Energy Research Centre is the only R&D centre in the country designated as a Nodal Agency for the implementation of the programmes of MNES.

The centre has been designated as a regional test centre for testing solar thermal equipment by MNES. The Bureau of Indian Standard has approved the centre for testing wood-burning stoves. The centre has provided consultancy to countries in the Asia-Pacific region such as the Maldives, Bangladesh, Sri Lanka, Myanmar, Kiribati and Tuvalu, in the area of renewable energy sources, energy management and environmental protection. The centre has helped the states of Haryana, Panjab and Himachal Pradesh in solving problems associated with energy planning, management and environmental protection.

The centre has done work on solar thermal energy storage, solar detoxification, biomethanation of agricultural/industrial/forest wastes, biomass combustion and gasification, indoor air quality, energy and environmental conservation and management, and hydrodynamics of polymeric solutions. The Energy Research Centre has professional contacts with universities such as the University of Florida, the University of Cincinnati, SRI International USA, and Lakehead University in Canada. The centre has helped the states of Haryana, Punjab and Himachal Pradesh, U.T. Chandigarh, J&K State, and the North-Eastern states in solving problems associated with energy planning and management and Environmental protection.

LHC project
The university has participated in the project called International Collaboration for Research for Elementary Particles and the Large Hadron Collider (LHC) CERN, Geneva CMS Experiment with a Government of India grant of Rs. 24.9 million.

Student life

Cultural events
"Cyanide" is the annual festival of DCET/UICET. The festival often hosts star performers, DJ nights and other events. Tatva is the student magazine of DCET/UICET. There is an annual debate competition called the Polemic. Aavishkar was the technical fest of UIET until 2013. Goonj is the techno-cultural fest and Umang is the annual sports fest of UIET.

Panjab University is active on social media websites such as Facebook, Twitter and Instagram.

Student council

The office of the Panjab University Campus Students Council (PUCSC) is located in the student centre. The student centre is the hub of students' activities – academic, cultural, social and political – besides being the favourite eating and hanging out zone for students. The Students' Council consists of the departmental representatives and other office bearers i.e. president, vice-president, secretary and joint-secretary directly elected by the students from the various teaching departments on the campus. The Dean of Student Welfare is ex officio chairman of the council.

The Students' Council organises youth festivals, both national and international, academic debates, literary and cultural events and educational tours, besides looking after the interests of the students in general. In 2015, in a referendum by University, students voted for vehicle free campus in academic areas.

Notable people

Notable alumnus

 Manmohan Singh (Former Prime Minister)
 Inder Kumar Gujral (Former Prime Minister)
 Sushma Swaraj (Former Foreign Minister)
 Kalpana Chawla (First Indian Woman To Go To Space)
 Harnaaz Sandhu (Miss Universe)
 Yuvraj Singh (Cricketer)
 Neeraj Chopra (Olympic Gold Medalist)
 Charanjit Singh Channi (Former CM Punjab)
 Bhupinder Singh Hooda (Former CM Haryana)
 Jai Ram Thakur (Former CM Himachal Pradesh)
 Manish Tewari (Former Union Minister)
 Kiran Bedi (Former IPS & former LG Puducherry)
 Ayushmann Khurrana (Actor)
 Yash Pal (Actor)
 Nuruddin Farah (Actor)
 Sunil Bharti Mittal  (Entrepreneur)
 Mahie Gill (Actress)
 Babbu Maan (Singer)
 Irshad Kamil (Bollywood lyric writer) 
 Tarun Tejpal
 Gul Panag (Actress)
 Satinder Sartaaj (Singer)
 Sukhbir Singh Badal (Deputy CM, Punjab)
 Vandana Shiva (Environmentalist)
 Rajiv Pratap Rudy (Politician)
 Kirron Kher (MP, Chandigarh)
 Vikram Batra (PVC, Indian Army)
 Sukhpal Singh Khaira (Politician)
 Ohanna Shivanand (actress)
 Subodh Kumar Jaiswal
 Baburam Bhattarai
 Selja Kumari (former MP and Congress Politician) 
 Yashaswini Singh Deswal
 K. K. Aggarwal
 Navjot Singh Sidhu
 Satish Dhawan
 Deepak Pental
 Narinder Nath Vohra (Former Governor J&K)
 Zahid Abrol
 Kamaljit S. Bawa
 Gurpreet Singh Lehal
 Yami Gautam (Actress) 
 Poonam Dhillon
 Jimmy Shergill
 Jassie Gill
 Raj Bawa
 Mita Vashisht
 Surilie Gautam
 Khushwant Singh
 Sahir Ludhianvi
 Mandeep Singh
 Balraj Sahni
 Rochak Kohli
 Shankar Dayal Sharma
 Jaspal Bhatti
 Lakshmi Puri                    * Yash Kartik

Notes

References

External links

 
Universities in Punjab, India
1882 establishments in India
Educational institutions established in 1882
State universities in India
Recipients of the Maulana Abul Kalam Azad Trophy